Apomatoceros  is a genus of catfish (order Siluriformes) of the family Trichomycteridae, its sole representative species being Apomatoceros alleni. This fish grows to about 14.6 centimetres (5.7 in) SL and originates from the Amazon River. The specific name honours the collector of the type, zoologist William Ray Allen (1885-1955) of Indiana University.

References

Trichomycteridae
Monotypic freshwater fish genera
Catfish genera
Fish of the Amazon basin
Taxa named by Carl H. Eigenmann